The 1961 Estonian SSR Football Championship was won by Kopli Kalev.

Championship play-off

Bottom play-off

References

Estonian Football Championship
Est
Football